Dansha is a town in Tigray, Ethiopia, located in the northwestern part of the country.

History 
On July 7, 1988, during the Ethiopian Civil War, the Ethiopia government's Third Revolutionary Army's 604 Army Corps was ambushed by the Tigray People's Liberation Front (TPLF) as it was leaving its base at Dansha, resulting in around 3,000 government casualties.

Dansha was part of Begemder Province until the 1987 Constitution of Ethiopia divided the country into regions on September 18, 1987, at which time Dansha became a part of North Gonder Region. When the current regions were formed in 1992 after the Ethiopian Civil War, Dansha became part of the Tigray Region.

During the 4 November Northern Command Attacks, forces loyal to the TPLF attacked the Fifth Battalion of the Northern Command of the Ethiopian National Defense Force in Dansha. This was one of the primary causes of the Tigray war. The clashes that ensued resulted in significant destruction to the town.

Transportation 
Dansha is located on the main road between Gondar and Humera.

References 

Populated places in the Tigray Region